Cochisea sinuaria is a species of moth in the family Geometridae first described by William Barnes and James Halliday McDunnough in 1916. It is found in North America.

References

Further reading

 

Bistonini
Articles created by Qbugbot
Moths described in 1916